Kangaroo Bus Lines is an Australian operator of bus services in the Moreton Bay Region of Brisbane. It operates eight services under contract to the Queensland Government under the Translink banner.

History
In 1978 Daryl Webster purchased Kangaroo Bus Lines with six buses. In 1980 the three bus Narangba Bus Service was purchased.

In April 2012, Kangaroo Bus Lines relocated from Morayfield to its current headquarters at Burpengary.

In 2016, Kangaroo Bus Lines opened a new depot on the Sunshine Coast, at Kunda Park

Routes

Fleet
As at January 2018, the fleet consisted of 121 buses and coaches.

References

External links
Translink timetables

Bus companies of Queensland
Public transport in Brisbane
Translink (Queensland)